Sheikr Al-Shabani (born 5 January 1950) is a Saudi Arabian middle-distance runner. He competed in the men's 1500 metres at the 1976 Summer Olympics.

References

1950 births
Living people
Athletes (track and field) at the 1976 Summer Olympics
Saudi Arabian male middle-distance runners
Olympic athletes of Saudi Arabia
Place of birth missing (living people)